Paul Hanley and Nathan Healey were the defending champions but only Healey competed that year with Jeff Coetzee.

Coetzee and Healey lost in the final 7–5, 7–5 against František Čermák and Leoš Friedl.

Seeds
Champion seeds are indicated in bold text while text in italics indicates the round in which those seeds were eliminated.

 František Čermák /  Leoš Friedl (champions)
 Aleksandar Kitinov /  Petr Luxa (first round)
 Jeff Coetzee /  Nathan Healey (final)
 Jordan Kerr /  Johan Landsberg (semifinals)

Draw

External links
 2002 Idea Prokom Open Men's Doubles Draw

Men's Doubles
Doubles